Vața de Jos is a commune in Hunedoara County, Transylvania, Romania. It is composed of thirteen villages: Basarabasa (Baszarabásza), Birtin (Birtin), Brotuna (Brotuna), Căzănești (Kazanesd), Ciungani (Csungány), Ocișor (Ócsisor), Ociu (Olcs), Prăvăleni (Prevaleny), Prihodiște (Prihodest), Tătărăștii de Criș (Tataresd), Târnava de Criș (Ternáva), Vața de Jos and Vața de Sus (Felváca).

Natives
 Arsenie Boca

References

Communes in Hunedoara County
Localities in Transylvania